Elections to Barnsley Metropolitan Borough Council were held on 7 May 1998.  One third of the council was up for election and the Labour party kept overall control of the council.

Election result

This resulted in the following composition of the council:

Ward results

+/- figures represent changes from the last time these wards were contested.

By-elections between 1998 and 1999

References

1998 English local elections
1998
1990s in South Yorkshire